Chaplin is a village in the Canadian province of Saskatchewan within the Rural Municipality of Chaplin No. 164 and Census Division No. 7. The community is situated on the Trans-Canada Highway approximately 85 km from Moose Jaw and 90 km from Swift Current. The main industries of Chaplin are Saskatchewan Minerals and farming/ranching. Chaplin consists of eight streets, two crescents, and four avenues (including the avenue on the 'other side of the (train) tracks').

History 
Chaplin incorporated as a village on 8 October 1912.

Geography 
Chaplin is situated on the Trans-Canada Highway between Moose Jaw and Swift Current, and on the north edge of Chaplin Lake.

Demographics 

Government 
Chaplin is governed by an elected Mayor and five councilors. The village employs a Village Administrator, Village Foreperson, and on Saturdays an additional individual works at the Village Dump administering public waste disposal (there is also weekly curb-side trash pick-up).

Climate

See also 
 List of communities in Saskatchewan
 Villages of Saskatchewan

References 

Villages in Saskatchewan
Chaplin No. 164, Saskatchewan
Division No. 7, Saskatchewan